Lithium 12-hydroxystearate (C18H35LiO3) is a chemical compound classified as a lithium soap.  In chemistry, "soap" refers to salts of fatty acids. Lithium 12-hydroxystearate is a white solid. Lithium soaps are key component of many lubricating greases.

Use

Lithium 12-hydroxystearate exhibits high oxidation stability and a dropping point up to around 200 °C. Most greases used today in motor vehicles, aircraft, and heavy machinery contain lithium stearates, mainly lithium 12-hydroxystearate.  Greases can be made with the addition of several different metallic soaps.  Some greases are prepared from sodium, barium, lithium, and calcium soaps.  Lithium soap greases are preferred for their water resistance, and their oxidative and mechanical stability.  Depending on the grease, they also have good performance at high or low temperatures, but not both.

Production
To produce lithium 12-hydroxystearate, lithium hydroxide and the fatty acid are combined in an aqueous medium.  With vigorous stirring, dilute monohydrate lithium hydroxide is gradually added to a dispersion of the fatty acid in water heated to slightly below boiling. Since these lithium soaps are difficult to filter, they are collected by spray drying.  For applications, lithium 12-hydroxystearate is usually dispersed in synthetic oils such as silicone oil and ester oil.  The synthetic oils are preferred for their greater stability and ability to perform at extreme temperatures.

The 12-hydroxystearic acid is prepared by the hydrogenation of castor oil.  After primary reaction of the saturation of most of the double bonds, dehydration and reduction of the hydroxyl group leads to the stearic acid.  Hydrogenated castor oil results in a mixture of 12-hydroxystearic acid and stearic acid.

References

External links

 

Greases
Lithium salts
Organolithium compounds
Stearates